Fierrot le pou is a 1990 French 8-minute short film directed by Mathieu Kassovitz, his debut film. He also plays the lead role in the film as the basketball player.

Synopsis
An adolescent loner meets an attractive young woman in a gymnasium and tries to impress her with his skill as a basketball player.  Unfortunately, his skill is virtually non-existent and his futile attempts to net the ball only embarrasses him further. Still, he is determined to succeed by imagining he is a black basketball player.

Cast
 Mathieu Kassovitz as the sloppy male basketball player
 Solange Labonne as Solange, the female basketball player
 Alain Bienna Labinski as the black basketball player

Technical contributions
 Image : Georges Diane
 Sound : Vincent Tulli
 Montage : Chantal Rémy

About the film
 For his first film, Mathieu Kassovitz did not have a lot of means. He was inspired by the film model of Luc Besson in his debut film Le Dernier Combat where the story line requires neither lighting nor dialog.
 Chantal Rémy, Kassovitz' mother, did the editing of the film.
 The title is derived from the Jean-Luc Godard film Pierrot le fou and the French expression fier comme un pou (proud like a louse) which is used to characterize someone very proud of himself.

External links
IMDb page
Film page on director Mathieu Kassovitz website (in French)

1990 films
Basketball films
Films directed by Mathieu Kassovitz
French short films
1990s French films